Major Harold William Tilman, CBE, DSO, MC and Bar, (14 February 1898 – November 1977) was an English mountaineer and explorer, renowned for his Himalayan climbs and sailing voyages.

Early years and Africa
Bill Tilman was born on 14 February 1898 in Wallasey, Cheshire, the son of a well-to-do sugar merchant John Hinkes Tilman and his wife Adeline Schwabe (née Rees). He was educated at Berkhamsted Boys school. During the First World War he entered the Royal Military Academy, Woolwich and, on 28 July 1915, he graduated from Woolwich where he was commissioned as a second lieutenant into the Royal Field Artillery of the British Army. Tilman fought at the Battle of the Somme, and was twice awarded the Military Cross for bravery. His climbing career, however, began with his acquaintance with Eric Shipton in Kenya, East Africa, where they were both coffee growers. Beginning with their joint traverse of Mount Kenya in 1929 and their ascents of Kilimanjaro and the fabled "Mountains of the Moon" Ruwenzori, Shipton and Tilman formed one of the most famed partnerships in mountaineering history. When it came time to leave Africa, Tilman was not content with merely flying home but rode a bicycle across the continent to the West Coast where he embarked for England.

World War II
He volunteered for service in the Second World War; he first saw action during the Battle of France helping to cover the retreat in Flanders before getting to the beaches at Dunkirk. Tilman then served in North Africa, Iraq and Iran before being called on for special duty in 1943. He then was dropped by parachute into Albania behind enemy lines to fight with Albanian and Italian partisans. For his actions there he was awarded the Distinguished Service Order for his efforts, and was given the keys to the city of Belluno which he helped save from occupation and destruction.

Mount Everest & Nanda Devi

Tilman was involved in two of the 1930s Mount Everest expeditions - participating in the 1935 Reconnaissance Expedition, and reaching 27,200 feet without oxygen as the expedition leader in 1938. He penetrated the Nanda Devi sanctuary with Eric Shipton in 1934, and in 1936 he went on to lead an Anglo-American expedition to Nanda Devi. With the support of a team which included Peter Lloyd and H. Adams Carter, Tilman and Noel Odell succeeded in making the first ascent of the  mountain, which remained the highest summit climbed by man until 1950. Tilman later described their arrival on the summit:
Odell had brought a thermometer, and no doubt sighed for the hypsometer. From it we found that the air temperature was  but in the absence of the wind we could bask gratefully in the friendly rays of our late enemy the sun. It was difficult to realise that we were actually standing on top of the same peak which we had viewed two months ago from Ranikhet, and which had then appeared incredibly remote and inaccessible, and it gave us a curious feeling of exaltation to know that we were above every peak within a hundred miles on either hand. Dhaulagiri, 1,000ft higher, and 200 miles away in Nepal, was our nearest rival. I believe we so far forgot ourselves as to shake hands on it.

In 1939, Tilman was the first man to attempt climbing in the remote and unexplored Assam Himalaya, exploring the Southern approaches of Gori Chen, 6538 metres, before his team succumbed to malaria. In 1947 he attempted Rakaposhi, then made his way to Kashgar to join up with Eric Shipton in a lightweight attempt on Muztagh Ata, 7546 metres, which nearly succeeded. On his way back to India, he detoured through Afghanistan's Wakhan Corridor to see the source of the river Oxus. During his extensive exploration of the areas of Langtang, Ganesh and Manang in Nepal in 1949, Tilman was the first to ascend Paldor, 5896 metres, and found the pass named after him beyond Gangchempo.

He was awarded in 1952 the Royal Geographical Society's Founder's Medal for his achievements.

Sailing / mountain exploration
Following his military career behind enemy lines in the Second World War, Tilman took up deep sea sailing. Sailing in deep seas on the Bristol Channel Pilot Cutter Mischief, which he purchased in 1954, and subsequently on his other pilot cutters Sea Breeze and Baroque, Tilman voyaged to Arctic and Antarctic waters in search of new and uncharted mountains to climb. On his last voyage in 1977, in his eightieth year, Tilman was invited to ship as crew in En Avant with mountaineers sailing to the South Atlantic to climb Smith Island. The expedition was led, and the boat skippered, by the youthful Simon Richardson. He and his crew aboard the old, converted steel tug made it successfully and without incident to Rio de Janeiro. Thereafter, en route to the Falkland Islands, they disappeared without trace - it was presumed the ship had foundered with all hands.

Chronological summary of expeditions
 1929: Tilman is introduced to rock climbing in the Lake District of England.
 1930: He ascends Mawenzi and almost ascends Kibo on Kilimanjaro, with Eric Shipton.
 1930: He makes first ascent of West Ridge of Batian, and traverses to Nelion, with Shipton.
 1932: Tilman ascends Mounts Speke, Baker, and Stanley in the Ruwenzori Range, with Shipton.
 1932: In April, he is involved in an accident in the Lake District which leads to the death of J. S. Brogdon.
 1932: Later that year, he makes various climbs in the Alps.
 1933: Tilman ascends Kilimanjaro (to summit) alone.
 1934: Tilman and Shipton, with three others, make the first recorded entrance into the Nanda Devi Sanctuary. They also explore the nearby Badrinath Range.
 1935: Tilman unable to acclimatise on the Mount Everest reconnaissance expedition led by Eric Shipton, but climbs various 20,000 ft. peaks in the Everest region.
 1936: Tilman attempts various peaks and passes, including the Zemu Gap, in Sikkim, near Kangchenjunga. Later, he leads the first ascent of Nanda Devi.
 1937: Shipton and Tilman make a major reconnaissance and surveying expedition in the Karakoram.
 1938: Tilman leads another Mount Everest expedition; he and three others reach above 27,300 ft (8,320 m) but fail to reach the summit.
 1938: He traverses the Zemu Gap.
 1939: He leads an expedition in the remote Assam Himalaya, which ends in disaster. They attempt Gori Chen, but reach only the lower slopes. The party was ravaged by Malaria, causing the death of one member.
 1941: Tilman climbs various peaks in Kurdistan.
 1942: He makes a night ascent of Zaghouan, in Tunisia.
 1947: Tilman leads an attempt on Rakaposhi which explores five different routes, none of which get near the summit. The expedition then explored the Kukuay Glacier on the southwest side of the Batura Muztagh.
 1947: He attempts Muztagh Ata, with Shipton and Gyalgen Sherpa.
 1948: Tilman attempts Bogda Feng, in northern Xinjiang, with Shipton and two others, but they only reach outlying summits.
 1948: He attempts Chakragil, in western Xinjiang.
 1948: He travels in the Chitral area of the Hindu Kush.
 1949: Tilman leads a four-month exploratory and scientific expedition to the Langtang, Ganesh, and Jugal Himals in Nepal, in the early stages of that country's re-opening to outsiders. He climbs Paldor in the Ganesh Himal.
 1950: He leads the British Annapurna Expedition, which gets close to the summit of Annapurna IV, and attempts other nearby peaks.
 1950: Tilman and Charles Houston view Mount Everest from the lower slopes of Pumori, on the recently opened Nepalese side of the peak.
 1955 – 12 months, 20,000 miles: First voyage in Mischief. Together with Jorge Quinteros he performs the first longitudinal crossing of the Southern Patagonian Ice Field.
 1957 – 12 months, 21,000 miles, circumnavigation of the African continent
 1959 – 12 months, 20,000 miles, South Atlantic, Iles Crozet
 1961 – 4 months, 7,500 miles, West Greenland - Upernavik region
 1962 – 4 months, 6,500	miles, West Greenland and Baffin Island
 1963 – 4 months, 7,000	miles, Bylot Island, Baffin Bay
 1964 – 4 months, 3,700 miles, East Greenland
 1964 – 5 months, 10,000 miles, skippering the schooner Patanela to Heard Island in the Southern Ocean
 1965 – 4 months, 4,000 miles, East Greenland - Return visit
 1966 – 12 months, 20,400 miles, Islands of the Southern Ocean
 1968 – 3 months, 2,500 miles, East Greenland, Jan Mayen, Loss of Mischief
 1969 – 4 months, 3,400 miles, first voyage in Sea Breeze - East Greenland
 1970 – 4 months, 5,000 miles, South West Greenland - Faeringehavn, Julianhaab, Nanortalik, Torsukatak
 1971 – 4 months, 5,000 miles, Faroe Islands, Iceland, East Greenland - Angmassalik
 1972 – 3 months, 3,000 miles,	East Greenland, Loss of Sea Breeze
 1973 – 4 months, 5,000 miles, First voyage in Baroque, to West Greenland.
 1974 – 4 months, 7,000 miles, circumnavigation of Spitzbergen
 1975 – 4 months, 5,000 miles, West Greenland
 1976 – 4 months, East Greenland - Angmagssalik - Reykjavik
 1977 - 1 month, Reykjavik-Lymington
 1977 – 4 months (?), Carried as crew/navigator on Simon Richardson's En Avant from Southampton to Las Palmas then Rio de Janeiro. Vessel presumed lost at sea en route to the Falkland Islands with loss of all hands.

Sources:

H.W.Tilman, the seven Mountain Travel Books

H.W.Tilman, the eight Sailing / Mountain exploration Books

Resources

Books 
 H. W. Tilman: The Collected Edition (Vertebrate Publishing and Lodestar Books, 2016–17), comprising:
 Snow on the Equator (1937) 
 The Ascent of Nanda Devi (1937) 
 When Men and Mountains Meet (1946) 
 Mount Everest 1938 (1948) 
 Two Mountains and a River (1949) 
 China to Chitral (1951) 
 Nepal Himalaya (1952) 
 Mischief in Patagonia (1957) 
 Mischief among the Penguins (1961) 
 Mischief in Greenland (1964) 
 Mostly Mischief (1966) 
 Mischief Goes South (1968) 
 In Mischief's Wake (1971) 
 Ice With Everything (1974) 
 Triumph and Tribulation (1977) 
 Eric Shipton, The Six Mountain-Travel Books (Mountaineers Books, 1997), .
 H. W. Tilman, Mount Everest 1938 (Pilgrims Publishing)  (contains the Appendix B on the Yeti)
 H. W. Tilman, Nepal Himalaya (Pilgrims Publishing) 
 H. W. Tilman, The Seven Mountain-Travel Books (Mountaineers' Books) , comprising:
 Snow on the Equator (1937)
 The Ascent of Nanda Devi (1937)
 When Men and Mountains Meet (1946)
 Everest 1938 (1948)
 Two Mountains and a River (1949)
 China to Chitral (1951)
 Nepal Himalaya (1952)
 H. W. Tilman, Eight Sailing/Mountain-Exploration Books (Diadem Books) , comprising:
 Mischief in Patagonia (1957)
 Mischief among the Penguins (1961)
 Mischief in Greenland (1964)
 Mostly Mischief (1966)
 Mischief Goes South (1968)
 In Mischief's Wake (1971)
 Ice With Everything (1974)
 Triumph and Tribulation (1977)

See also
List of people who disappeared mysteriously at sea

References

Further reading
 Anderson, John Richard Lane, High Mountains and Cold Seas: Life of H. W. Tilman (Gollancz Books) 
 Madge, Tim, The Last Hero - Bill Tilman: A Biography of the Explorer (The Mountaineers' Books) 
 Richardson, Dorothy, The Quest of Simon Richardson (Gollancz Books, 1986)
 Astill, Tony, Mount Everest : The Reconnaissance 1935 (published by the author, 2006) 
 Perrin, Jim, Shipton and Tilman : The Great Decade of Himalayan Exploration ( Hutchinson, London, 2013)

External links 
Chris Bonington, 'Tilman, Harold William (1898–1977x9)’, rev., Oxford Dictionary of National Biography, Oxford University Press, 2004
Travels with Tilman, 1956-1977
Aboard Mischief with Tilman 1957-1958
Sherborne School Archives – holds the 1938 Everest Expedition diary kept by Lieutenant-Colonel Peter Roderick Oliver, together with the ice axe he used on the expedition
New Collected Edition of Tilman's 15 mountaineering and travel books and the Anderson biography, jointly published by Vertebrate Publishing and Lodestar Books.

1898 births
1970s missing person cases
1977 deaths
Military personnel from Cheshire
British Army personnel of World War I
British Army personnel of World War II
Companions of the Distinguished Service Order
Commanders of the Order of the British Empire
English explorers
English mountain climbers
Explorers of Central Asia
Graduates of the Royal Military Academy, Woolwich
People educated at Berkhamsted School
People from Wallasey
People lost at sea
Recipients of the Military Cross
Royal Artillery officers